The Wolverhampton–Shrewsbury line is the railway line from Wolverhampton to Shrewsbury via Wellington; it was originally built by the Shrewsbury and Birmingham Railway. The line is double track throughout, with rarely used relief sidings at Cosford and four tracks through Wellington station.

Electrification from Stafford Road Junction to Oxley, is provided solely to enable electric stock to access Alstom's Oxley TRSMD, and is therefore constructed as a "trolley wire" suitable for low speeds only.

Signalling was centred in the panel box at Madeley Junction until 2012, but following the closure of the box there, the West Midlands Signalling Centre at Saltley has taken control of most of the route via its Oxley/Telford Workstation. Previously, Oxley signal box controlled the depot access and sidings until it closed on 27 November 2010 under the West Midlands Resignalling scheme.  Towards Shrewsbury, Abbey Foregate signal box takes over for the last few miles beyond Wellington.

The line also had a service to Walsall which ran to Wellington via Wolverhampton, but this service was cutback to Wolverhampton, and then eventually withdrawn altogether.

History

The line was opened by the Shrewsbury and Birmingham Railway (S&BR) in 1849, which merged with the Great Western Railway (GWR) in 1854.

Route 
The towns and villages served by the route are listed below, East to West.

 Wolverhampton (City of Wolverhampton) – 6 platforms
 Bilbrook (Staffordshire) – 2 platforms
 Codsall (Staffordshire) – 2 platforms
 Albrighton (Shropshire) – 2 platforms
 Cosford (Shropshire) – 2 platforms
 Shifnal (Shropshire) – 2 platforms
 Telford Central (Telford and Wrekin) – 2 platforms
 Oakengates (Telford and Wrekin) – 2 platforms
 Wellington (Telford and Wrekin) – 3 platforms
 Shrewsbury (Shropshire) – 5 platforms (numbered 3 to 7)

The map includes the former GWR Madeley Branch which formed a connection from Madeley Junction to the Wellington to Craven Arms Railway at Lightmoor Junction.

Passenger services 

Avanti West Coast, Transport for Wales and West Midlands Trains operate passenger trains on this line.

West Midlands Trains operate one service per hour in each direction on the line; this service calls at all local stations to Wolverhampton before continuing to Birmingham New Street. There is an additional service in each direction in the peak times again, calling at all local stations. These services are operated using  British Rail Class 170 Diesel Multiple Units, which are currently being withdrawn as the  British Rail Class 196 Diesel Multiple Units enter service.

These services are typically operated using the British Rail Class 158 but sometimes use British Rail Class 150 or British Rail Class 153 both of which are Diesel Multiple Units

Since December 2014, Virgin Trains (now Avanti West Coast) have run a daily return services between Shrewsbury and London Euston calling at Wellington and Telford Central only. These services are operated using British Rail Class 221  Diesel Multiple Unit. However, as they are retired in 2023, the British Rail Class 805   Bi-Mode Multiple Unit will operate this service.

Freight 

The Coalbrookdale line, which served Ironbridge Power Station to the south of Telford near Ironbridge, joined the Wolverhampton–Shrewsbury line at Madeley Junction, which is between Telford Central and Shifnal stations. Coal trains ran by EWS up to 2012 and by Fastline up to 2010 used the route, supplying the power station. Between 2012 and 2015, the power station was converted to run on biomass which was supplied mostly via Liverpool Docks by GBRf trains until closure of the plant in November 2015.

In 2008 the former Wellington to Stafford line was rebuilt as far as Donnington, for freight use. Telford International Railfreight Park is located at a  site just off the Hortonwood Roundabout near Donnington which opened in 2009. Currently the only rail business to and from the site is Ministry of Defence traffic which runs down from Warrington so only uses a brief portion of the line between Shrewsbury and Wellington.

See also 
Shrewsbury and Birmingham Railway
Railways of Shropshire

References

External links 

History of the Railway
London Midland
Transport for Wales

Rail transport in Shropshire
Rail transport in Wolverhampton
Rail transport in Staffordshire
Shrewsbury and Atcham
Railway lines in the West Midlands (region)
Telford and Wrekin
Standard gauge railways in England